Subotica is a village in Serbia. It is situated in the Koceljeva municipality, in the Mačva District of Central Serbia. The village had a Serb ethnic majority and a population of 289 in 2002. Former Serbian minister of internal affairs, Vojan Lukić, was born there.

Historical population
1948: 630
1953: 644
1961: 573
1971: 474
1981: 427
1991: 335
2002: 289

References

See also
 List of places in Serbia

Populated places in Mačva District